Euxoa hilaris is a moth of the family Noctuidae. It is found in Turkey, southern and eastern Russia, Bulgaria, Turkmenia, the Caucasus, Armenia, Lebanon, Iraq and Iran.

External links
Checklist of Lepidoptera of Turkey
Fauna Europaea
Lepiforum e.V.
The Noctuidae (Lepidoptera) of the Daghestan Republic (Russia)

Euxoa
Moths of Asia
Moths described in 1838